The Unspeakable Oath is a game magazine that was published by Pagan Publishing from 1990 to 2001, and later by Arc Dream Publishing starting in 2010.

History

Pagan Publishing was founded in 1990 in Columbia, Missouri by 19-year-old John Tynes with a volunteer staff of gamers from Columbia including Jeff Barber, Brian Bevel, John H. Crowe III, Les Dean, and Chris Klepac.  Together they created The Unspeakable Oath #1 (December 1990), the company's premiere publication, a digest-sized quarterly focusing on Call of Cthulhu. That first issue caught the attention of Chaosium's Keith Herber, who helped Tynes recruit Cthulhu writers like Scott David Aniolowski and Kevin Ross. Meanwhile, Pagan published The Unspeakable Oath #2 (Spring 1991) and The Unspeakable Oath #3 (Summer 1991). The third issue led Dennis Detwiller to move to Columbia to join Pagan.

In the beginning, The Unspeakable Oath was solely devoted to Call of Cthulhu. The production values of the first six issues (1990–1992) were semi-professional, with black & white cardstock covers. Writers included several past and future Cthulhu names, including Steve Hatherly, Keith Herber, and Scott David Aniolowski. The Unspeakable Oath #7 (Fall 1992) was the first to feature sturdier covers, and with The Unspeakable Oath #10 (Fall 1993), the magazine was increased to RPG-book size and given the first full-color cover. At the same time as these upgrades, the magazine's frequency dropped as Pagan began publishing other supplements. From 1994–1997, Issues #11–#15 were published, on average, once per year. After a 4-year hiatus, only one more issue, The Unspeakable Oath #16/17, was published by Pagan themselves in 2001.

After another long hiatus, Dennis Detwiller's RPG company Arc Dream Publishing acquired a license from Pagan to publish The Unspeakable Oath, starting with Issue #18, which appeared in December 2010.  Arc Dream has since averaged a couple of issues every year.

Reception
In the November–December 1993 edition of Pyramid (Issue #4), Chris W. McCubbin reviewed issues 7, 8, and 9 of The Unspeakable Oath and gave the magazine a strong recommendation, saying, "The final assessment on The Unspeakable Oath is simple — every gamer with an interest in Call of Cthulhu (which means virtually every mature and intelligent gamer) should read this magazine religiously, and that's all there is to it."

In the January 1994 edition of Dragon (Issue #201), Allen Varney was similarly impressed, saying, "Chaosium’s Call of Cthulhu game (CoC) has spawned the best one-game support magazine I’ve ever seen: The Unspeakable Oath. This 80-page wonder crawls forth quarterly from Pagan Publishing, a small Columbia, Missouri company — more accurately, one talented and energetic guy named John Tynes." Varney praised the magazine's articles as "Fascinating features, columns, letters, and huge amounts of period source material (which is sorely lacking in Chaosium's own support for CoC)." He also admired the artwork, "unsettlingly illustrated by Blair Reynolds and others." Varney concluded that the magazine was "an Elder Godsend for both Keepers and players."

The version of The Unspeakable Oath by Arc Dream Publishing won the 2013 Silver Ennie Award for "Best Aid/Accessory".

Reviews
Pyramid 16/17

References

Call of Cthulhu (role-playing game)
Cthulhu Mythos role-playing games
ENnies winners
Irregularly published magazines published in the United States
Magazines established in 1990
Magazines published in Columbia, Missouri
Role-playing game magazines